Dynashift is a type of gearbox on many Massey Ferguson tractors. In May 2006 Tier 3 Compliant gearboxes were released, and the production of Dynashift halted.

References

it consists of a four stage gear shifter that does not need the clutch to be pressed.

Automobile transmissions